Zachary Lipton (born 1985) is a machine learning researcher and jazz saxophonist from New Rochelle, New York. He is currently an Assistant Professor of Machine Learning and Operations Research at Carnegie Mellon University, where he runs the Approximately Correct Machine Intelligence (ACMI) lab. Previously, he completed his undergraduate studies at Columbia University and a PhD in Computer Science at University of California, San Diego. He is the grandson of Issachar Miron, the composer of the popular song Tzena, Tzena, Tzena.

Discography
First Steps (2007)

References

External links 
 Official site
 ACMI Lab website

1985 births
21st-century American saxophonists
American jazz saxophonists
American male saxophonists
Jazz musicians from New York (state)
Jewish American musicians
Jewish jazz musicians
Living people
Musicians from New Rochelle, New York
21st-century American male musicians
American male jazz musicians
21st-century American Jews
Columbia College (New York) alumni